Dilip Moran was a Member of the Legislative Assembly from the Doom Dooma constituency in India from 2011 to 2016. He belongs to the Bhartiya Janata Party.

References

Living people
Bharatiya Janata Party politicians from Assam
Date of birth missing (living people)
Place of birth missing (living people)
Members of the Assam Legislative Assembly
Assam MLAs 2011–2016
Year of birth missing (living people)